Cocaine Anonymous (C.A.) is a twelve-step program formed in 1982 for people who seek recovery from drug addiction. It is patterned very closely after Alcoholics Anonymous, although the two groups are unaffiliated.  While many C.A. members have been addicted to cocaine, crack, speed or similar substances, C.A. accepts all who desire freedom from "cocaine and all other mind-altering substances" as members.

C.A. uses the book Alcoholics Anonymous as its basic text.  Complementing this are the C.A. Storybook, Hope, Faith and Courage: Stories from the Fellowship of Cocaine Anonymous. and the AA book Twelve Steps and Twelve Traditions.

C.A. was formed in Los Angeles in 1982 by the late Johnny Segal and several others. Seagal worked in the film industry and saw a number of people who had difficulty finding help from anyone knowledgeable about the special difficulties presented by cocaine addiction. 

Co-Anon (formerly CocAnon) is a program for families of cocaine users, analogous to Al-Anon for the friends and family of alcoholics.

See also 
 Addiction recovery groups
 List of twelve-step groups

References

Further reading

External links 
CA World Services website
Online meeting website
Official UK website
Co-Anon for friends and family of addicts

Cocaine
Organizations established in 1982
Twelve-step programs
Non-profit organizations based in Los Angeles
Addiction and substance abuse organizations